Bangladesh competed at the 2016 Summer Olympics in Rio de Janeiro, Brazil, from 5 to 21 August 2016. This was the nation's ninth consecutive appearance at the Summer Olympics.

The Bangladesh Olympic Association selected a team of seven athletes, four men and three women, for the Games, competing in five different sports (archery, athletics, golf, shooting, and swimming). Six of them made their Olympic debut, with freestyle swimmer Mahfizur Rahman Sagor returning for his second Olympic appearance from London 2012. Majority of the roster received their spots by wild card entries or Tripartite invitations, without having qualified. Meanwhile, golfer Siddikur Rahman, the only qualified sportsman of the team, was selected to carry the Bangladeshi flag in the opening ceremony. Bangladesh, however, has yet to win an Olympic medal.

Archery
 
Bangladesh received an invitation from the Tripartite Commission to send a female archer to the Olympic tournament.

Athletics

Bangladesh received universality slots from IAAF to send two athletes (one male and one female) to the Olympics.

Track & road events

Golf

Bangladesh entered one golfer into the Olympic tournament. Siddikur Rahman (world no. 308) qualified directly among the top 60 eligible players for the men's singles based on the IGF World Rankings as of 11 July 2016. Rahman is the first Bangladeshi to qualify for any Olympic Games in his own right, rather than relying on wild cards, tripartite commission entries or universality places.

Shooting
 
Bangladesh received an invitation from the Tripartite Commission to send a men's 10 m air rifle shooter to the Olympics.

Qualification Legend: Q = Qualify for the next round; q = Qualify for the bronze medal (shotgun)

Swimming

Bangladesh received a Universality invitation from FINA to send two swimmers (one male and one female) to the Olympics.

References

External links 

 

Nations at the 2016 Summer Olympics
2016
2016 in Bangladeshi sport